Cantiere navale di Riva Trigoso (Riva Trigoso Shipyard) is an Italian shipyard. Founded on 1 August 1897 by Erasmo Piaggio's Società Esercizio Bacini (a drydock-operating company) in Riva Trigoso, it mostly built commercial ships. In 1925 the Piaggio heirs decided to spin off the drydock business and the company was renamed Cantieri del Tirreno''. It diversified into building warships and was heavily damaged during World War II.

The shipyard was merged into Italcantieri in 1973 and then into Fincantieri in 1984.

Bibliography

1866 establishments in Italy
Fincantieri
Shipyards of Italy
Companies established in 1866
Companies based in Liguria
Shipbuilding companies of Italy